Montelaterone is a village in Tuscany, central Italy,  administratively a frazione of the comune of Arcidosso, province of Grosseto, in the area of Mount Amiata. At the time of the 2001 census its population amounted to 283.

Montelaterone is about 52 km from Grosseto and 4 km from Arcidosso, and it is situated on a sandstone peak between the valleys of Ente and Zancona rivers.

Main sights 

 Church of San Clemente (14th century), main parish church of the village
 Church of Madonna della Misericordia (17th century), with frescoes by Francesco and Giuseppe Nicola Nasini
 Chapel of Santa Lucia in Stiacciaie (14th century)
 Pieve of Santa Maria a Lamula (12th century), between Montelaterone and Arcidosso, it is an important and ancient Romanesque church.
 Palazzo Pretorio (13th century), ancient city hall
 Walls of Montelaterone, old fortifications which surround the village since 11th century
 Cassero Senese, a 13th-century fortress

References

Bibliography 
 Aldo Mazzolai, Guida della Maremma. Percorsi tra arte e natura, Le Lettere, Florence, 1997
 Giuseppe Guerrini, Torri e castelli della Provincia di Grosseto, Nuova Immagine Editrice, Siena, 1999

See also 
 Bagnoli, Arcidosso
 Le Macchie
 Salaiola
 San Lorenzo, Arcidosso
 Stribugliano
 Zancona

Frazioni of Arcidosso